René Arocha (born February 24, 1966) is a former MLB baseball player.

Biography
René Arocha studied at the Regla high school in Havana. After graduating high school, Arocha became a member of Cuba's famed national baseball team.

In 1991, during an international competition, Arocha defected, opting for a life in the United States and the chance at playing in the Major Leagues. His story became known across the States when Hispanic media began talking about him, and Arocha was the subject of many television reports on Telemundo and Univision.

In 1991, Arocha was signed by the St. Louis Cardinals, and assigned to the Cardinals' farm team in Louisville, Kentucky. As a pitcher in Louisville in 1992, Arocha posted 12 wins and 7 losses with an earned run average of 2.70. These numbers prompted the Cardinals to bring Arocha to the Major Leagues, and he debuted with the Cardinals in 1993, winning 11 games and losing 8, while striking out 96 opponents and accumulating an ERA of 3.78.

The 1994 and 1995 seasons were marred for Arocha by injuries, and he only won 7 games in those two years combined, while also losing 7. After missing the entire 1996 season with injuries, he was dealt as a player to be named later to the San Francisco Giants in a deal to acquire catcher Tom Lampkin.

Arocha spent much of 1997 with the Giants' Pacific Coast League affiliate, the Phoenix Firebirds. He won 7 games while losing only 3. Arocha returned to the majors with the Giants, pitching ten innings and posting an 11.32 ERA before earning his release on August 6, 1997. The New York Yankees signed him one week later, where he completed the season as a member of their Triple-A affiliate in Columbus.

Arocha finished his professional career with the Houston Astros' Triple-A affiliate in New Orleans in 1998, posting a 5–4 record and a 5.45 ERA in 11 starts.

See also

List of Cubans
List of baseball players who defected from Cuba

References

External links
, or Retrosheet, or Baseball-Reference (Minor and Mexican leagues), or EcuRed (biography), or 
Pura Pelota (Venezuelan Winter League)
Arocha paving the way for other Cuban defectors. NYTimes, March 21, 2016

1966 births
Living people
Columbus Clippers players
Industriales de La Habana players
Leones de Yucatán players
Major League Baseball pitchers
Major League Baseball players from Cuba
Cuban expatriate baseball players in the United States
Metropolitanos de La Habana players
New Orleans Zephyrs players
Phoenix Firebirds players
San Francisco Giants players
St. Louis Cardinals players
Baseball players from Havana
Sultanes de Monterrey players
Tiburones de La Guaira players
Cuban expatriate baseball players in Venezuela
Defecting Cuban baseball players
Cuban expatriate baseball players in Mexico